Arne Thoms (born 1 January 1971) is a former professional tennis player from Germany.

Career
As a junior, Thoms had a good year in 1989, making the semi-finals of the boys' singles at Wimbledon and the quarter-finals at Roland Garros.

Thoms made his first big impression on the ATP Tour with his performance at the Manchester Open in 1991. He was a quarter-finalist, beating two top 30 players en route, Horst Skoff and Omar Camporese. The following year he had an upset win over world number six Ivan Lendl in the opening round of the 1992 Milan Indoor tournament, which he entered as a qualifier. He did well again at Manchester in 1992, reaching another quarter-final. The German was also a quarter-finalist at both Newport and Zaragoza in 1993 and at the 1994 CA-TennisTrophy in Vienna. His best showing as a doubles player came in the 1995 Tel Aviv Open, when he and partner Brent Larkham were semi-finalists.

He made the second round of three Wimbledon Championships during his career, with wins over Todd Witsken in 1992, Bernd Karbacher in 1994 and Eyal Erlich in 1995.

Challenger titles

Singles: (4)

Doubles: (6)

References

1971 births
Living people
German male tennis players
West German male tennis players
Sportspeople from Osnabrück
Tennis people from Lower Saxony